Giacomo Matteotti  (22 May 1885 – 10 June 1924) was an Italian socialist politician. On 30 May 1924, he openly spoke in the Italian Parliament alleging the Fascists committed fraud in the recently held elections, and denounced the violence they used to gain votes. Eleven days later he was kidnapped and killed by Fascists.

Political career
Matteotti was born into a wealthy family, in Fratta Polesine, Province of Rovigo in Veneto. He graduated in law at the University of Bologna.

An atheist and from early on an activist in the socialist movement and the Italian Socialist Party (PSI), he opposed Italy's entry into World War I (and was interned in Sicily during the conflict for this reason).

He was elected deputy three times: in 1919, 1921 and 1924.

As a follower of Filippo Turati, Matteotti became the leader of the reformist Unitary Socialist Party (PSU) in the Italian Chamber of Deputies after a split from the more radical Italian Socialist Party.

Opposition to Fascism

Matteotti openly spoke out against Fascism and Benito Mussolini, and for a time was leader of the opposition to the National Fascist Party (NFP). From 1921 he denounced fascist violence in a pamphlet titled Inchiesta socialista sulle gesta dei fascisti in Italia (Socialist enquiry on the deeds of the fascists in Italy).

In 1924 his book The Fascisti Exposed: A Year of Fascist Domination was published and he made two impassioned and lengthy speeches in the Chamber of Deputies denouncing Fascism and declaring that the last election, marked by intimidation and militia violence, was "invalid".

In the speech Matteotti gave on 30 May 1924 in Parliament, he strongly contested the violence, said "In Naples in one conference that the head of the constitutional opposition was to hold, he was prevented due to the mobilization of the armed corps, which intervened in the city", as a fraud in the 1924 elections (however won by PNF thanks to the Acerbo Law, which put in place an electoral system that guaranteed a majority to the Fascists). According to some theories, this speech was not the only cause of his murder. In fact, according to Renzo De Felice's essay Breve Storia del Fascismo, Matteotti publicly condemned the alliance of the socialist trade unions and the fascist counterpart. Moreover, he found out evidence of bribes from Sinclair Oil in favour of Mussolini, in order to get permission for Sinclair's exploitation of petroleum reservoirs under Italian control.

Murder
On 10 June 1924 Matteotti was bundled into a Lancia Lambda and stabbed several times with a carpenter's file as he was struggling to escape. His corpse was found after an extensive search near Riano, 23 kilometers north of Rome, on 16 August 1924.

Five men (Amerigo Dumini — a prominent member of the Fascist secret police, the Ceka — Giuseppe Viola, Albino Volpi, Augusto Malacria and Amleto Poveromo) were arrested a few days after the kidnapping. Another suspect, Filippo Panzeri, fled from arrest.

Consequences of the murder
The death of Matteotti sparked widespread criticism of Fascism. A general strike was threatened in retaliation, but the opposition preferred to raise a "moral question" that would point to public disapproval in fascism, to bring about its downfall. Then "Fascism fielded an articulated series of misdirections, obstructions of justice and red herrings, to declare the moral question closed". 

Since Mussolini's government did not collapse and the King refused to dismiss him, all the anti-fascists (except for the  Communist Party of Italy) started to abandon the Chamber of Deputies. They retired on the "Aventine Mount", like ancient Roman plebeians. They thought to force the Crown to act against Mussolini, but on the contrary this strengthened Mussolini, who tried to defuse the tension with a speech in Montecitorio on 13 June 1924. After a few weeks of confusion, Mussolini gained a favourable vote by the Senate of the Kingdom.

Despite pressure from the opposition, Victor Emmanuel III refused to dismiss Mussolini, since the Government was supported by a large majority of the Chamber of Deputies and almost all the Senate of the Kingdom. Moreover, he feared that compelling Mussolini to resign could be considered a coup d'état, that eventually could lead to a civil war between the Army and the Blackshirts.

But during the summer, the trial against Matteotti's alleged murderers and the discovery of the corpse of Matteotti once again spread rage against Mussolini: newspapers launched fierce attacks against him and the fascist movement.

On 13 September, a right-wing fascist deputy, Armando Casalini, was killed on a tramway in retaliation for Matteotti's murder by the anti-fascist Giovanni Corvi.

During the autumn of 1924, the extremist wing of the Fascist Party threatened Mussolini with a coup, and dealt with him on the night of San Silvestro of 1924. Mussolini devised a counter-maneuver, and on 3 January 1925 he gave a famous speech both attacking anti-fascists and confirming that he, and only he, was the leader of Fascism. He challenged the anti-fascists to prosecute him, and claimed proudly that Fascism was the "superb passion of the best youth of Italy" and grimly that "all the violence" was his responsibility, because he had created the climate of violence. Admitting that the murderers were Fascists of "high station", as Hitler later did after the Night of the Long Knives, Mussolini rhetorically claimed fault, stating "I assume, I alone, the political, moral, historical responsibility for everything that has happened. If sentences, more or less maimed, are enough to hang a man, out with the noose!" Mussolini concluded with a warning: Italy needs stability and Fascism would assure stability to Italy in any manner necessary.

This speech is considered the very beginning of the dictatorship in Italy.

Trials against his murderers
Only three men (Dumini, Volpi and Poveromo) were convicted and shortly after released under amnesty by King Victor Emmanuel III.

Before the trial against the murderers, the High Court of the Senate started a trial against general Emilio De Bono, commander of the Fascist paramilitary Blackshirts (MVSN), but he was discharged.

After the Second World War, in 1947, the trial against Francesco Giunta, Cesare Rossi, Dumini, Viola, Poveromo, Malacria, Filippelli and Panzeri was re-opened. Dumini, Viola and Poveromo were sentenced to life imprisonment.

In none of these three trials was evidence declared of Mussolini's involvement, due to trial extinction for death of defendant.

Mussolini's alleged involvement

The involvement of Mussolini in the assassination is much debated.

Historians suggest some different theories. The main biographer of Mussolini, Renzo De Felice, was convinced that the Duce was not innocent. Even Aurelio Lepre and Emilio Gentile thought that Mussolini wanted the death of Matteotti.

The former socialist and anti-fascist journalist Carlo Silvestri in 1924 was a harsh accuser of Mussolini; later, when he joined the Italian Social Republic, he affirmed that Mussolini had shown him the papers for the Matteotti case, and eventually he changed his mind. Silvestri became a strong defender of Mussolini's innocence in Matteotti's murder, and suggested that the socialist was killed by a plot, in order both to damage Mussolini's attempt to raise a leftist government (with the participation of Socialists and Popolari) and to cover some scandals in which the Crown (with the American oil company Sinclair Oil) was involved.

De Felice argued that maybe Mussolini himself was a political victim of a plot, and almost surely he was damaged by the crisis that followed the murder. Many fascists left the Party, and his government was about to collapse. Moreover, his secret attempt to bring Socialists and Popolari into a new reformist government was ruined.

John Gunther wrote in 1940 that "Most critics nowadays do not think that the Duce directly ordered the assassination ... but his moral responsibility is indisputable", perhaps with underlings believing they were carrying out Mussolini's desire performing the kidnapping and murder on their own. Other historians, including Justin Pollard and Denis Mack Smith, thought Mussolini was probably aware of the assassination plot but that it was ordered and organized by someone else.

Mauro Canali suggests that Mussolini probably did order the murder, as Matteotti uncovered and wanted to make public incriminating documents proving that Mussolini and his associates sold to Sinclair Oil exclusive rights to all Italian oil reserves.

Family
In 1912 he had met Velia Titta, younger sister of the famous baritone Ruffo Titta, and they married in a civil ceremony in 1916. They had three children: Giancarlo (1918-2006), Matteo (1921-2000) and Isabella (1922-1994).

One of Matteotti's sons, Gianmatteo Matteotti (known Matteo), became a Social Democratic parliamentary deputy after World War II, serving as Italy's minister of tourism in 1970–72 and minister of foreign trade from 1972–1974, and died in 2000.

Works
 1924 The Fascisti Exposed: A Year of Fascist Domination,  (1969)

Legacy
Numerous monuments to Matteotti have been established, including a Monument in Rome along Lungotevere Arnaldo da Brescia, where the kidnap-murder took place.

In the Florestano Vancini's film The Assassination of Matteotti (1973), Matteotti is played by Franco Nero.

Footnotes

Bibliography

 Luigi Cyaheled, Matteotti è vivente, Napoli, Casa Editrice Vedova Ceccoli & Figli, 1924.
 Carlo Silvestri, Matteotti, Mussolini e il dramma italiano, Roma, Ruffolo, 1947.
 Renzo De Felice, Mussolini il fascista, I, La conquista del potere. 1921–1925, Torino, Einaudi, 1966.
 Carlo Rossini, Il delitto Matteotti fra il Viminale e l’Aventino, Bologna, Il Mulino, 1968.
 Antonio G. Casanova, Matteotti. Una vita per il socialismo, Milano, Bompiani, 1974.
 Adrian Lyttelton, La conquista del potere. Il fascismo dal 1919 al 1929, Roma-Bari, Laterza, 1974.
 Ives Bizzi, Da Matteotti a Villamarzana. 30 anni di lotte nel Polesine (1915–1945), Treviso, Giacobino, 1975.
 Carlo Silvestri, Matteotti, Mussolini e il dramma italiano, Milano, Cavallotti editore, 1981.
 Alexander J. De Grand, Breve storia del fascismo, Roma-Bari, Laterza, 1983.
 Matteo Matteotti, Quei vent’anni. Dal fascismo all’Italia che cambia, Milano, Rusconi, 1985.
 Fabio Andriola, Mussolini. Prassi politica e rivoluzione sociale, S.l., F.U.A.N., 1990.
 Mauro Canali, Il delitto Matteotti. Affarismo e politica nel primo governo Mussolini, Camerino, Università degli studi, 1996; Bologna, Il Mulino, 1997, 2004, 2015. ; 2004. 
 Valentino Zaghi, Giacomo Matteotti, Sommacampagna, Cierre, 2001. 
 Marcello Staglieno, Arnaldo e Benito. Due fratelli, Milano, Mondadori, 2003. 
 Mauro Canali, Il delitto Matteotti, Bologna, Il Mulino, 2004.
 Nunzio Dell'Erba, Matteotti: azione politica e pensiero giuridico, in "Patria indipendente", 28 maggio 2004, a. LIII, nn. 4–5, pp. 21–23.
 Stanislao G. Pugliese, Fascism, Anti-fascism, and the Resistance in Italy: 1919 to the Present, Rowman & Littlefield, 2004. 
 Enrico Tiozzo, La giacca di Matteotti e il processo Pallavicini. Una rilettura critica del delitto, Roma, Aracne, 2005. 
 Gianpaolo Romanato, Un italiano diverso. Giacomo Matteotti, Milano, Longanesi, 2010.
 Giovanni Borgognone, Come nasce una dittatura. L'Italia del delitto Matteotti, Bari, Laterza, 2012. 
 Alexander J. De Grand, Italian Fascism: Its Origins & Development, University of Nebraska Press, 2000, 
 Adrian Lyttelton, The Seizure of Power: Fascism in Italy, 1919–1929, Routledge, 2003, 
 Stanislao G. Pugliese, Fascism, Anti-fascism, and the Resistance in Italy: 1919 to the Present, Rowman & Littlefield, 2004,

See also
Il delitto Matteotti by Florestano Vancini (1973). Matteotti is played by Franco Nero.

External links
 
What a Murder by Mussolini Teaches Us About Khashoggi and M.B.S., By Alexander Stille, Oct. 23, 2018, The New York Times

1885 births
1924 deaths
People from the Province of Rovigo
Italian Socialist Party politicians
Unitary Socialist Party (Italy, 1922) politicians
Deputies of Legislature XXV of the Kingdom of Italy
Deputies of Legislature XXVI of the Kingdom of Italy
Deputies of Legislature XXVII of the Kingdom of Italy
Politicians of Veneto
Italian anti-fascists
Italian anti-capitalists
Italian atheists
Kidnapped Italian people
Assassinated Italian politicians
Deaths by stabbing in Rome
People murdered in Italy
1924 murders in Italy